Peperomia acuminata, is a species of plant in the genus Peperomia. Its native range reaches from  central South America to Central America and the West Indies.

Uses
Peperomia acuminata is used in folk medicine as well in foods.

References

acuminata
Flora of South America